Bucket List is the debut extended play of South Korean rapper Big Naughty. It was released on February 25, 2021, by H1ghr Music.

Singles 
"Girl at the Coffee Shop" was pre-released on February 2, 2021.

Music and lyrics 
On "Joker", Big Naughty expresses the sorrow of love. On "Frank Ocean", he sings calmly on Cosmic Boy's melodic funk beat. On "Brand New World", he pays homage to Seo Taiji's "Classroom Idea" and expresses his frustration as a student. On "Bucket List", he raps speedily on the exciting synth beat produced by DPR Cream and "shows off his solid rap skills".

Critical reception 

Hwang Duha of Rhythmer rated Bucket List 3 out of 5 stars. According to him, Big Naughty showed that he can make sophisticated and witty songs. However, there is still room for improvement as the featuring artists steal the spotlight in each song.

myK_daytona of Hiphopplaya rated the EP 7 out of 10. According to him, the latter half of the EP is unpolished compared to the first four songs. Nevertheless, Big Naughty's adventurous spirit "brings a smile to his face".

Track listing

Charts

Sales

References 

2021 debut EPs
H1ghr Music EPs
Hip hop EPs
Korean-language EPs